Bogdan Cristian Szijj (born 11 November 1998) is a Romanian professional footballer who plays as a defender for Liga III club CSM Reșița. Szijj started his career in his hometown, at CSM Școlar Reșița and made the Liga II debut at only 16 years old, for Metalul Reșița, in a 1-0 victory against FC Bihor Oradea.

Personal life
He is the son of Ioska Szijj, former player of CSM Reșița in the 1990s, in a squad that is considered to be the best in the history of the club. Ioska played along with names like Roco Sandu, Leontin Doană or Vasile Ciocoi.

Honours
CSM Reșița
Liga III: 2018–19, 2021–22

References

External links
 
 

1998 births
Living people
Sportspeople from Reșița
Romanian footballers
Association football midfielders
Liga I players
Liga II players
Liga III players
FC Voluntari players
CS Sportul Snagov players
CSM Reșița players